Rhina may refer to:

 Rhina, Hesse, a village in Germany
 Rhina ancylostoma or bowmouth guitarfish, a species of ray
 Rhina Espaillat (born 1932), Dominican-American poet and translator